Bel Air (or Bel-Air) is a residential neighborhood on the Westside of Los Angeles, California, in the foothills of the Santa Monica Mountains. Founded in 1923, it is the home of the Hannah Carter Japanese Garden and the American Jewish University.

History

The community was founded in 1923 by Alphonzo Bell. Bell owned farm property in Santa Fe Springs, California, where oil was discovered. He bought a large ranch with a home on what is now Bel Air Road. He subdivided and developed the property with large residential lots, with work on the master plan led by the landscape architect Mark Daniels. He also built the Bel-Air Bay Club in Pacific Palisades and the Bel-Air Country Club. His wife chose Italian names for the streets. She also founded the Bel-Air Garden Club in 1931.

Together with Beverly Hills and Holmby Hills, Bel Air forms the Platinum Triangle of Los Angeles neighborhoods.

Fires

On November 6, 1961, a fire ignited and devastated the community of Bel Air, destroying 484 homes in the area. On December 6, 2017, a fire started by a homeless encampment burned in the same area, destroying six homes.

Geography
It lies across Sunset Boulevard from the northern edge of the main campus of the University of California, Los Angeles. At the heart of the community sits the Bel-Air Country Club and the Hotel Bel-Air.

Along with Beverly Hills and the Los Angeles community of Brentwood, Bel Air is part of a high-priced area on the Westside known as the "three Bs."

Climate
This region experiences warm and dry summers. According to the Köppen Climate Classification system, Bel Air has a warm-summer Mediterranean climate, abbreviated "Csb" on climate maps.

Demographics
The 2000 U.S. census counted 7,691 residents in the  Bel Air neighborhood; with  it has among the lowest population densities for the city and the county. In 2008, the city estimated that the population had increased to 8,253.

In 2000, the median age for residents was 46, which was high for city and county neighborhoods. The percentages of residents aged 50 and older was among the county's highest.

The median yearly household income in 2008 was $207,938, the highest figure for any neighborhood or city in Los Angeles County. Renters occupied 14.5% of the housing stock, and house- or apartment-owners held 85.5%. The average household size of 2.4 people was considered typical for Los Angeles.

The 4.1% of families headed by single parents was considered low for city and county neighborhoods. The percentages of married people in Bel Air were among the county's highest—66.0% for men and 65.7% for women. There were 808 veterans, or 12.9% of the population.

The neighborhood was considered "not especially diverse" ethnically within Los Angeles, with a relatively high percentage of white people. The breakdown was whites, 83.0%; Asians, 8.2%; Latinos, 4.6%; African Americans, 0.9%; and others, 3.2%. Iran (26.1%) and South Africa (8.2%) were the most common places of birth for the 24.1% of the residents who were born abroad—which was an average percentage for Los Angeles as a whole.

Neighborhoods
Of several entrances, there are two main ones: (1) the East Gate at Beverly Glen and Sunset Boulevards and (2) the West Gate at Bellagio Way and Sunset Boulevard, opposite an entrance to UCLA. Bel Air is generally subdivided into three distinct neighborhoods: East Gate Old Bel Air, West Gate Bel Air, and Upper Bel Air.

Bel Air Estates, the original subdivision of the Bel Air community, is generally bounded by Nimes Road to the north, Sunset Boulevard to the south, Beverly Glen Boulevard to the east and both sides of Bel Air Road to the west.

Attractions
The Hannah Carter Japanese Garden is located in Bel Air. It was inspired by the gardens of Kyoto. Many structures in the garden—the main gate, garden house, bridges, and shrine—were built in Japan and reassembled on site. Antique stone carvings, water basins and lanterns, as well as the five-tiered pagoda, and key symbolic rocks are also from Japan.

Government and infrastructure
The Los Angeles County Department of Health Services SPA 5 West Area Health Office serves Bel Air.

It lies within the 5th city council district, represented by Paul Koretz.  It is located in the 90077 (Bel Air Estates & Beverly Glen) ZIP code, which is part of the city of Los Angeles. Stone Canyon Reservoir lies in the northeastern part of Bel Air. Established in 1994, it serves around 500,000 people. The Bel Air Association has been operational since 1942, dedicated to preserving the aesthetic appearance of the residential community. The Bel Air Association is located at the entrance of the East Gate of Bel Air at 100 Bel Air Road.

Emergency services

Fire services
Los Angeles Fire Department Station 71 is in the area.

Police services
The Los Angeles Police Department operates the West Los Angeles Community Police Station at 1663 Butler Avenue, 90025, serving the neighborhood.

Education

Almost two-thirds (66.1%) of Bel Air residents aged 25 and older had earned a four-year degree by 2000, a high percentage for the city and the county. The percentages of residents in that age range with a bachelor's degree or greater were high for the county. The community is within the Los Angeles Unified School District. The area is within Board District 4. As of 2009, Steve Zimmer represented the district.

Schools
The schools within Bel Air are as follows:

Public
 Roscomare Road Elementary School, 2425 Roscomare Road
 Community Magnet Charter Elementary School, 11301 Bellagio Road. , because the school's points-based admissions system does not favor area residents, children living in Bel Air generally do not attend the school. It is located in the former Bellagio Road School campus.

Roscomare Road and Warner Avenue Elementary School in Westwood are the zoned elementary schools serving Bel Air. Bel Air is within the attendance boundaries of Emerson Middle School in Westwood and University High School, West Los Angeles.

In April 1983, an advisory committee of the LAUSD recommended closing eight LAUSD schools, including Bellagio Road School. The committee did not target Fairburn Avenue School in Westwood, as a way of allowing it to preserve its ethnic balance, and so it can take children from Bellagio Road in case it closed. In August 1983, the board publicly considered closing Bellagio, which had 240 students at the time. The school's enrollment had been decreasing. In May 1983 the board voted to keep the school open. In February 1984, after the composition of the board had changed, the board voted to close the Bellagio Road School.

Bel Air previously housed the Bellagio Road Newcomer School, a 3rd–8th grade school for newly arrived immigrants. In 2002, it had 390 students from Armenia, China, El Salvador, Guatemala, Korea, Russia, and other countries. This program was housed in the former Bellagio Road school.

Private
 Marymount High School, 10643 Sunset Boulevard
 Stephen S. Wise Temple Elementary School/Milken Community Schools, K–12, 15500 Stephen S. Wise Drive
 John Thomas Dye School,  K–6, 11414 Chalon Road
 The Mirman School
 Westland School, 16200 Mulholland Drive, was founded in 1949. It moved to its current location in 1965, becoming the first school to locate in what has now developed into a major 'institutional corridor' in the area of the Sepulveda Pass.

University
Bel Air is home to the American Jewish University. Additionally, Bel Air borders the University of California, Los Angeles on the south.

In popular culture
Television shows and films have been filmed in Bel Air, or are said to take place in the community. Exterior shots for the Beverly Hillbillies were shot in and around 750 Bel Air Road, built by Lynn Atkinson (and later sold to hotelier Arnold Kirkeby after Atkinson's wife refused to move into a house she thought too ostentatious).
Several scenes in the film "Get Hard" (2015) were set in Bel Air.
Exterior scenes from films such as Get Shorty (1995) have also been filmed in the area. Several episodes of the television show The Rockford Files were filmed in Bel Air.

The television sitcom The Fresh Prince of Bel-Air, starring actor and rapper Will Smith, was set in the neighborhood, although the exterior shots used were filmed in nearby Brentwood.

The Bel Air house featured in the film Strangers When We Meet (1960) was built and completed during filming, and still stands today as a private residence.

The Bel Air Film Festival, first held in 2008, is an annual international film festival held in Bel Air and the Los Angeles area.

Bel Air is also represented in music, such as in the song "Bel Air" by Lana Del Rey.

The Chevrolet Bel Air was a full-size car produced by Chevrolet for the 1950–1975 model years.

Notable people

 Jennifer Aniston, actress
 Warner Baxter, actor
 Arie and Rebecka Belldegrun, doctors
 Jack Benny, comedian
 Beyoncé, singer-songwriter, actress
 Wilt Chamberlain, Basketball Hall of Fame inductee
 Glenn Cowan (1952–2004), table tennis player
 Clint Eastwood, actor, film director
 Eric Eisner, Hollywood lawyer and executive, former president of The Geffen Film Company
 John Gilbert, actor
George Herbert Harries, US Army major general
 Alfred Hitchcock, film director
 Jay-Z, rapper
 Mary Livingstone, actress and comedian
 Sondra Locke, actress, film director
 Joni Mitchell, singer-songwriter
 Steven Mnuchin, 77th United States Secretary of the Treasury
 Kathy Hilton, socialite and philanthropist
 Richard Hilton, businessman and real estate  broker 
 Leonard Nimoy, actor, film director, poet, singer and photographer
 Chris Paul, basketball athlete
 President Ronald Reagan and First Lady Nancy Reagan
 Naty Saidoff, diamond dealer, real estate investor, founding member of the Israeli-American Council
 Darren Star, show and movie producer, writer
 Elizabeth Taylor, actress at 700 Nimes Road from 1982 until 2011
 Walter and Shirley Wang, Chinese-American philanthropists, son and daughter-in-law of Taiwanese business magnate Wang Yung-ching
 The Weeknd, singer-songwriter, actor
 Ethan and Hila Klein, YouTube personalities

See also

 List of districts and neighborhoods in Los Angeles
 List of largest houses in the Los Angeles Metropolitan Area

Footnotes

References

External links

 
1923 establishments in California
Populated places established in 1923
Neighborhoods in Los Angeles
Westside (Los Angeles County)
Populated places in the Santa Monica Mountains